Ryon Jeffry Bingham (born June 6, 1981) is a former American football defensive tackle. He attended Alta High School located in Sandy, Utah. Ryon Bingham graduated from the University of Nebraska with a degree in Crimininal Justice. Bingham was released from the Chargers defensive line on September 1, 2010.

Early years
Bingham was a standout football player and a two-time Class 5A heavyweight wrestling champion. He played offensive tackle and nose guard at Alta High School in Sandy, Utah. The Salt Lake Tribune Defensive Player of the Year, Gatorade Player of the year, Bingham earned All-State honors and was the Utah Player of the Year. In 1998, Bingham recorded 87 tackles, 14 sacks, four pass breakups, five fumbles caused and two recoveries. As a junior, he had 50 tackles and 13 sacks, helping his team to a 9-2 record and a state semifinal appearance in Utah’s largest class. As a heavyweight, Bingham went 64-1 with 58 pins en route to state championships in both 1998 and 1999, compiling a 28-0 mark with 25 pins as a senior.

College years
Bingham attended the University of Nebraska and was a Criminal Justice Major and a letterman in football.
In football, as a junior, he was an Honorable Mention All-Big 12 Conference selection and an Academic All-Big 12 Conference selection. As a senior, he was an All-Big 12 Conference selection.  In 2003  Bingham led Nebraska's interior defensive linemen with 56 total tackles. For his standout play, Bingham earned Second-team All-Big 12 honors  In 2002 as a junior he finished the season with 67 total tackles. He recorded nine tackles for loss, including 1.5 sacks.  Bingham saw significant action in 2001 as part of a four-man rotation at the two defensive tackle positions. He played in all 12 games as Jon Clanton’s backup at nose tackle, and finished the year with 18 tackles, including five for losses. Bingham was expected to see action as a redshirt freshman in 2000, but a broken right foot kept him out for the entire season. He was cast in August, then had surgery in September. Bingham redshirted in 1999.

Professional career
Bingham was drafted in the 7th round of the 2004 NFL Draft by the San Diego Chargers. The Chargers released him on September 1, 2010.

References

Huskers.com

1981 births
American football defensive tackles
Living people
Nebraska Cornhuskers football players
San Diego Chargers players
Players of American football from Utah
People from Sandy, Utah